George Washington Faris (June 9, 1854 – April 17, 1914) was an American lawyer and politician who served three terms as a U.S. Representative from Indiana from 1895 to 1901.

Biography 
Born near Rensselaer, Indiana, to James and Margaret, Faris attended the public schools.
He was graduated from Asbury University, Greencastle, Indiana, in 1877.
He studied law.

He was admitted to the bar in 1877 and commenced practice in Indianapolis, Indiana.
He moved to Terre Haute, Indiana, in 1880 and continued the practice of law.
He was an unsuccessful Republican candidate for judge of the circuit court in 1884.

Congress 
Faris was elected as a Republican to the Fifty-fourth, Fifty-fifth, and Fifty-sixth Congresses (March 4, 1895 – March 3, 1901).
He served as chairman of the Committee on Manufactures (Fifty-fifth and Fifty-sixth Congresses).
He declined to be a candidate for renomination in 1900.

Later career and death 
He resumed the practice of law in Terre Haute, Indiana, and shortly thereafter moved to Washington, D.C., and continued the practice of law until his death in that city on April 17, 1914.
He was interred in Highland Lawn Cemetery, Terre Haute, Indiana.

Personal life
In 1878, he married Anna Claypool, daughter of Solomon Claypool.

References

External links

 

1854 births
1914 deaths
DePauw University alumni
Politicians from Terre Haute, Indiana
People from Jasper County, Indiana
19th-century American politicians
Burials in Indiana
Republican Party members of the United States House of Representatives from Indiana